Homestead is a L5 meteorite fallen in 1875 in Iowa, United States.

History
On the evening of 12 February 1875 above Iowa a brilliant fireball was observed. About 100 meteorite fragments fell over a  snowy countryside area from Amana to Boltonville in Iowa County. The area was wooded and covered by snow, impeding recovery efforts. On 10 February a  snowfall blanketed the ground, preventing the great majority of the fragments from being discovered until Spring. The  main mass was found along with a  fragment buried  in the soil.

As of December 2011, approximately  has been found.

Composition and classification
It is a L5 type ordinary chondrite. It is also brecciated and veined.

Notes

Bibliography
 Ivanova, M. A.; Krot, A. N.; Mitreikina, O. B.; Zinovieva, N. G., "Chromite-rich Inclusions in the Homestead (L5) Chondrite", Abstracts of the Lunar and Planetary Science Conference, volume 23, page 585, 03/1992.

See also
 Glossary of meteoritics

External links 

 Encyclopedia of meteorites: Homestead
 Historic Meteorites: Homestead meteorite, Mark Bostick
 The Amana Meteorites by Gustavus Detlef Hinrichs

Meteorites found in the United States
Geology of Iowa
1875 in Iowa
1875 in science
Iowa County, Iowa